Christelle Bulteau (married name Franquelin; born 23 July 1963) is a former French track and field athlete specialising in the sprints.  She has two children.

International competitions

Personal records

References

External links
 

1963 births
Living people
French female sprinters
World Athletics Indoor Championships medalists